The 1948 Humboldt State Lumberjacks football team represented Humboldt State College during the 1948 college football season. Humboldt State competed in the Far Western Conference (FWC).

The 1948 Lumberjacks were led by first-year head coach Lou Tsoutsouvas in his only season at Humboldt State. They played home games at the Redwood Bowl in Arcata, California. Humboldt State finished with a record of six wins and three losses (6–3, 1–3 FWC). The Lumberjacks outscored their opponents 145–48 for the season.

Schedule

Notes

References

Humboldt State
Humboldt State Lumberjacks football seasons
Humboldt State Lumberjacks football